Max the Mutt College of Animation, Art & Design (formerly Max The Mutt Animation School, and before that Studio M) is a Canadian Private Career College, located in Toronto, Ontario.  Max the Mutt offers diplomas in Classical & Computer Animation & Production (4 years), Illustration & Storytelling for Sequential Arts (4 years), and Concept Art for Animation & Video Games (4 years). The curriculum is designed by former working professionals, some faculty teach part-time alongside working in the industry. As a Career College, the school emphasizes professionalism as well as course content. The school was founded in 1997 by Maxine Schacker and Tina Seemann.

Despite the school's emphasis on preparing students for the industry, the Ontario Ministry of Colleges and Universities regularly reports low graduation rates and low employment rates in field of study. As seen in the 2017  and the 2018, the school averages a 0%(2017) and 11%(2018) average rate of employment in selected field of study across all subjects. The most recent KPI report (2019)  shows a slight improvement with a 33% average in chosen field of study.

On February 28, 2022, Max the Mutt was acquired by Farvision  as a part of Farvisions expansion strategy.

References

https://www.sec.gov/Archives/edgar/data/1892274/000168316822003110/visionary_f1a3.htm
https://farvision.ca/max-the-mutt/

http://www2.tcu.gov.on.ca/pepg/audiences/pcc/2019-pcc-kpi/data/?pccid=101408

http://www2.tcu.gov.on.ca/pepg/audiences/pcc/2018-pcc-kpi/data/?pccid=101408

http://www2.tcu.gov.on.ca/pepg/audiences/pcc/2017-pcc-kpi/data/?pccid=101408

http://www2.tcu.gov.on.ca/pepg/audiences/pcc/2016-pcc-kpi/data/?pccid=101408

http://www2.tcu.gov.on.ca/pepg/audiences/pcc/2015-pcc-kpi/Max-Mutt-College-Animation-Art-Design-Toronto.html

External links

Private colleges in Ontario
Education in Toronto
Animation schools in Canada
Art schools in Canada
1997 establishments in Ontario